Joan Daugherty Chittister,  (born April 26, 1936), is an American Benedictine nun, theologian, author, and speaker. She has served as Benedictine prioress and Benedictine federation president, president of the Leadership Conference of Women Religious, and co-chair of the Global Peace Initiative of Women.

Biography

Early life 
Chittister was born on April 26, 1936, to Daniel and Loretta Daugherty. Her father died when she was very young and her mother married Harold Chittister. Joan Chittister described her step-father as a violently abusive alcoholic.

Education 
She was educated  by Sisters of St. Joseph, and later attended St. Benedict Academy in Erie, Pennsylvania. Chittister holds a master's degree from the University of Notre Dame and a Ph.D. in speech communication theory from Penn State University. She is also an elected fellow of St. Edmunds College at the University of Cambridge.

Career 
In 1971, Chittister was elected president of the Federation of St. Scholastica, a federation of twenty monasteries of Benedictine women in the United States and Mexico, established in 1922. She was a prioress of the Benedictine Sisters of Erie, Pennsylvania, for 12 years and is a past president of the Leadership Conference of Women Religious. She serves as co-chair of the Global Peace Initiative of Women (2016-2019), an inclusive international network of spiritual and community leaders. With this organization, she works to bring a spiritual perspective to conflict resolution fueled by pressing economic and ecological crises across the globe.

Chittister says that women's ordination has never been her primary focus. Her books deal with monasticism, justice and equality especially for women in church and society, interfaith topics, peace and others. She has won 16 Catholic Press Association awards for her books and numerous other awards for her work, including 12 honorary degrees from US universities.

She writes a column for the National Catholic Reporter, "From Where I Stand".

Penn State University holds the Joan D. Chittister Literary Archives.

A biography of Chittister was released by Orbis Books in October 2015, Joan Chittister: Her Journey from Certainty to Faith by Tom Roberts.

Controversies

Chittister's stances on contraception and women's ordination are known to contradict the official teachings of the Catholic Church. She was one of two nuns prohibited by Church authorities from attending the first Women's Ordination Worldwide conference on June 30, 2001. However, she not only attended, but gave the opening address. In another instance, Chittister rejected the Church's strictures against the 23 nuns who ran an advertisement in the New York Times attacking the Church's teaching on abortion.

Bibliography
Chittister has authored over 50 books and over 700 articles in numerous journals and magazines including: America, US Catholic, Sojourners, Spirituality (Dublin), and The Tablet (London). She is a regular contributor to NCRonline.org and HuffingtonPost.com, appeared on Oprah Winfrey's Super Soul Sunday in March 2015 and in May 2019, on Meet the Press with Tim Russert and Now with Bill Moyers.

She is the executive director of "Benetvision", a publications ministry of the Benedictine Sisters of Erie.

Recent publications
Joan Chittister: Essential Writings, a compilation from her best writing from books, articles and speeches, was published by Orbis Books in August 2014 (ed. Mary Lou Kownacki, OSB, Mary Hembrow Snyder, PhD). In 2019, Dear Joan: conversations with women in the church, editor Jessie Bazan was published by Twenty-third Publ.

 The Time Is Now, Random House: New York (2019).
 What Are You Looking For? Paulist Press (2019).
  A Little Rule for Beginners, Benetvision, Erie (2018).
  " We Are All One," Twenty-Third Publications. (2018)
  Radical Spirit, Random House: New York (2017).
 Two Dogs and a Parrot, BlueBridge (2015).
 In God's Holy Light, Franciscan Media: Cincinnati, OH (2015).
 Between the Dark and the Daylight," Image Books (2015)
 Our Holy Yearnings, Twenty-Third Publications. (2014)
 A Passion for Life, (New release) Orbis (2013)
  For Everything a Season, (New release of There is a Season), Orbis (2013)
 The Way of the Cross, Orbis Books: Maryknoll, NY (2013)
 The Sacred In-Between, Twenty-Third Publications (2013)
 Following the Path" Random House: New York (2012)
 Happiness, Eerdmans: Grand Rapids, MI. (2011).
 The Radical Christian Life, Liturgical Press. (2011)
 The Monastery of the Heart, BlueBridge. (2011) 
 God's Tender Mercy, Twenty-Third Publications: Mystic, CT.  (2010)
 The Rule of Benedict, Revised edition, Crossroad Publications (2010)
 Uncommon Gratitude, Liturgical Press: Collegeville, MN. (2010)
 The Liturgical Year, Thomas Nelson: Nashville, TN. (2009)
  "The Gift of Years," Blue Bridge (2008)
  "In Search of Belief," Liguori, (2006)
 Called to Question: A Spiritual Memoir, Sheed & Ward. (2004).

References

External links

 Joan Chittister's website
 Monasteries of the Heart
Benedictine Sisters of Erie
 NOW with Bill Moyers, Bill Moyers talks with Joan Chittister.
"NPR Interview: Weekend Edition Sunday with Liane Hansen."
Joan Chittister interviewed on Conversations from Penn State

Communication theorists
Living people
Pennsylvania State University alumni
Political activists from Pennsylvania
Writers from Erie, Pennsylvania
Roman Catholic activists
Roman Catholic writers
University of Notre Dame alumni
Place of birth missing (living people)
20th-century American Roman Catholic nuns
American Christian pacifists
1936 births
21st-century American Roman Catholic nuns
Catholics from Pennsylvania
American Benedictines
American people of Irish descent
Benedictine prioresses